Dominik Meisel (born 29 June 1999) is a German professional footballer who plays as a midfielder for Regionalliga Bayern club Würzburger Kickers.

References

Living people
1999 births
Association football midfielders
German footballers
1. FC Nürnberg players
Würzburger Kickers players
3. Liga players
Regionalliga players
People from Kulmbach
Sportspeople from Upper Franconia
Footballers from Bavaria